Don't Let The Bastards Grind You Down is the seventh studio album by The Toasters. It has a much more mature sound than their previous albums and wasn't as solely focused on one genre (2-Tone) as their other albums before it had been. The album's cover includes the supposed-Latin motto, "Illegitimis non carborundum", which is supposed to mean "one must not be ground down by the bastards", although it is largely faux-Latin, with "carborundum" (intended to look like a Latin gerundive) actually referring to silicon carbide, a type of abrasive.

Track listing

Personnel 
Dave Barry – keyboards
George Evageliou – engineer
Rick Faulkner – trombone
Rob "Bucket" Hingley – guitar, vocals
Jafo – design, illustrations
Joe Johnson – assistant engineer
Matt Malles – bass
MC Schneeberger – producer, mixing
John McCain – drums, vocals
Mento Buru – backing vocals
Allissa Myhowac – assistant engineer
Aaron Owens – guitar
Mike Reddy – illustrations, cover design
Fred Reiter – saxophone
Dale Rio – photography
Jack Ruby, Jr. – vocals
Sledge – trumpet, vocals
Larry "Ace" Snell – drums
David Waldo – keyboards

References 

1997 albums
The Toasters albums